Pelech is a surname. Notable people with the surname include:
 Adam Pelech (born 1994), Canadian ice hockey player
 Jack Pelech (1934–2008), Canadian lawyer
 Matt Pelech (born 1987), Canadian ice hockey player

Pelech may also refer to:
 Pelech (School), high school in Jerusalem, Israel
 Pelekh, kibbutz in northern Israel

See also
 
 Pelechy